Blue Dragon (stylized as BLUE DRAGON) is a Japanese anime television series adaptation of the Blue Dragon video game series. The series was produced by Studio Pierrot and broadcast on TV Tokyo. The first season ran for 51 episodes from April 2007 to March 2008. The second season, titled Blue Dragon: Trials of the Seven Shadows, ran for 51 episodes from April 2008 to March 2009. In North America, the series was licensed by Viz Media.

Plot
As Shu's village was being attacked by an unknown enemy, he and his friends, Jiro and Kluke decide to defend their home. They soon meet Zola and receive the powers of Shadow, an ability that lets them transform their shadow into a powerful monster. Shu receives one of the most powerful monsters, Blue Dragon, and they all set out to defeat their enemy.

Characters

Main characters
 
 
 The main protagonist of the series. Shu is an impulsive and adventurous kid. Originally from the fictional village of Talta, Shu does not give up in the face of adversity and it is thanks to his stubbornness that he will be able to defeat evil. Despite all the small flaws that make him up, Shu is honest, loyal, selfless and courageous. He has a great sense of duty and friendship and love are very important to him. He often happens to say stupid things or get lost in long speeches. Shu's shadow is Blue Dragon, one of the seven shadows of light, who will join him in the fight against the forces of evil. Bouquet is in love with him and, in the second season (especially during the last episodes) the girl seems to be finally reciprocated.
 
 
 The titular blue-colored dragon who is Shu's shadow.
 
 
 Jiro is a skillful and strong boy, gifted with a certain technique and strategy, who however has only one major flaw, which Zola repeatedly accuses him of: he is much, too impulsive, almost more than Shu. He is motivated to defeat Nene by a great desire for revenge, as he is responsible for the destruction of his village Muffei and the death of his family at the hands of General Szabo's forces. His shadow is Minotaur, which he discovers he owns after the destruction of his village. Initially he has an arrogant and individualistic attitude, but, over time, he will open up more to other people, becoming more kind and helpful.
 
 
 A green-furred Minotaur who is Jiro's shadow. Jiro discovered him after the destruction of Muffei.
 
 
 She is the best friend of Shu, a little girl expert in mechanics. She is good, sensitive, cautious but also easy to get angry (at least in the first season of the anime). Over the course of the story, she becomes close friends with both Bouquet and Jiro, who ends up feeling a great affection for her, because she reminds him of her younger sister. She is initially very jealous of the interactions between Shu and Bouquet, but will eventually cease to be. Kluke falls in love with Andropov, during the final episodes of the first season. Andropov is madly in love with her.
 
 
 A purple and pink Phoenix who is Kluke's shadow. Phoenix can enable Kluke to teleport large numbers of people and use forcefields.
 
 
 Marumaro is a Devee that Shu and his friends meet shortly after they leave Talta village. His shadow is Saber Tiger. Marumaro usually has an immature and casual demeanor, fascinated by beautiful girls, including Bouquet, although he still shows he has a big heart and is always ready to help his friends. During the battles he never backs down, calling himself the "champion of justice" each time.
 
 
 A humanoid smilodon who is Marumaro's shadow. Its most dangerous ability is its surprising speed.
 
 
 She is a girl in love with Shu, who claims to be his girlfriend. Sometimes she is a little distracted, but also sensitive and more attentive to the feelings of others than she seems. Overall, Bouquet is very kind and beautiful. Her shadow is Hippopotamus. Bouquet belongs to the Ra Clan where she has the power to make herself invisible, but not her clothes, and therefore has to undress to disappear. In the second series, Bouquet gets the bonding ability from Noi, which will allow her to increase the power of Blue Dragon and Saber Tiger by giving them superior armor and strength.
 
 
 A humanoid hippopotamus with bat-like wings who is Bouquet's shadow. He can unite with her so that they can shapeshift into any person, animal or object. When Bouquet gets the bonding ability from Noi during the second season, she and Hippopotamus can increase the power of Blue Dragon and Saber Tiger.
 
 
 She is a pirate of the skies and the final antagonist in the finale of the first anime series. She is cold and detached, always in control of the situation. She has white, waist-length hair, a dark complexion and a saber from which she never separates. Her shadow is the Killer Bat, which she obtained when she, Nene and her father visited the ruins dedicated to it. It was here that her father died protecting her from a landslide, and Zola, desperate, succumbed to the darkness and fell under their control. Darkness will engulf most of the world, until Shu and the others defeat them. In the second series, it was revealed that the good that was purged by Killer Bat was found by Dr. Tarkovsky who used it to create his "granddaughter", Primella.
 
 
 A humanoid bat who is Zola's shadow. Killer Bat remained silent until the goal to release the darkness was made known. Its real goal is to restore the world to its original state, which is darkness, in which there is neither light nor shadow. He will succeed in this regard by deceiving all the descendants of the knights of the light, or his traveling companions plus Logi and Deathroy.
 
 
 A young member of the Investiture Beings who befriends Shu and Bouquet. He can turn into a black dragon. Unlike the rest of the Investiture Beings, Noi cannoy bring his dragon form out in shadow form.

Gran Kingdom

Rosekstan

White Guardians

Investiture Beings

Other characters

Episodes

Production
Akira Toriyama, character designer for the Blue Dragon video game, said that Studio Pierrot approached him about an anime adaptation in February 2006. In his own words, he said:

Release
Based on the video game of the same title (although including several divergences from the original work), the series was announced in November 2006. Directed by Yukihiro Matsushita, written by Akatsuki Yamatoya, animated by studio Pierrot and co-produced by SKY Perfect Wellthink, TV Tokyo and Pierrot, the series was broadcast for fifty-one episodes on TV Tokyo from April 7, 2007, to March 29, 2008.

A second season, was broadcast for fifty-one episodes from April 5, 2008, to March 28, 2009.

In April 2007, Viz Media announced that it had licensed the anime for release in North America and Europe. An edited English language dub of the series premiered in the United States on Cartoon Network, on April 5, 2008. It also aired on Cartoon Network's Toonami Jetstream service until Jetstream was cancelled on January 30, 2009. Since then it has been discovered that Viz Media did make an uncut version of the Blue Dragon anime in English. This uncut version released by Manga Entertainment had the first 24 episodes released on DVD (exclusively in the UK) over three 2 disc DVD sets with the release date of further DVD sets cancelled due to lack of sales. These uncut episodes unlike the US DVD releases fully restores the original Japanese opening and closing, all edited scenes from the Cartoon Network version are restored including the original music, as well as having the option to view the series in Japanese with English subtitles. On July 22, 2011, Viz Media started streaming Blue Dragon episodes on VizAnime Tubi, and Hulu. At Otakon, Viz Media representative Amy Mar said that if the streaming numbers are good, they might release the uncut episodes on physical media.

References

External links
 

Blue Dragon
2007 anime television series debuts
2008 anime television series debuts
Adventure anime and manga
Anime television series based on video games
Comedy anime and manga
Fantasy anime and manga
Pierrot (company)
Shows on Toonami Jetstream
Toonami
TV Tokyo original programming
Viz Media anime
Works based on Microsoft video games